64 or sixty-four or variation, may refer to: 

 64 (number)

Dates
 one of the years 64 BC, AD 64, 1864, 1964, 2064, etc.
 June 4th (6/4)
 the date of the 1989 Tiananmen Square protests and massacre
 April 6th (6/4)
 April 6 AD (6/4)
 June 4 AD (6/4)

Places
 Highway 64, see list of highways numbered 64
 Interstate 64, a national route in the United States
 +64, country code dialing code of New Zealand; see Telephone numbers in New Zealand
 64 Angelina (asteroid 64), a main-belt asteroid

Other uses
 Nintendo 64, the third home console by Nintendo, released in 1996
 Commodore 64
 64-bit computing
 "64" (song), a 2011 song by hip hop band Odd Future
 Sixty Four (album), a 2004 album recorded in 1964 by Donovan
 Sixty-four (ship), a type of sailing warship
 A /64 Classless Inter-Domain Routing block

See also